Cattleya warneri (the "Warner's Cattley's orchid") is a labiate Cattleya species of orchid. The diploid chromosome number of C. warneri has been determined as 2n = 40.

References

External links 

warneri
warneri